Joseba Jon Larrinaga Perea (5 June 1968 – 7 May 2013) was a paralympic athlete from Spain who competed mainly in category T46 distance running events. He was born in Aretxabaleta.

Joseba had twice competed at the Paralympics, first in the 1996 then in the 2000. At the 1996 games, he competed in the 5000m and the marathon, finishing fifth in the former and winning a silver medal in the latter in a mixed class of T42-46 behind compatriot Javier Conde, who set a new world record. In the 2000 games, he was restricted to the marathon; however, this time missed out on a medal, managing to finish in fifth.

Joseba died on 7 May 2013 in Aramaio after being struck by a car while riding his bicycle.

Notes

References

External links
 
 

1968 births
2013 deaths
Paralympic athletes of Spain
Athletes (track and field) at the 1996 Summer Paralympics
Athletes (track and field) at the 2000 Summer Paralympics
Paralympic silver medalists for Spain
Medalists at the 1996 Summer Paralympics
Paralympic medalists in athletics (track and field)
Spanish male long-distance runners
Spanish male marathon runners
Road incident deaths in Spain
Paralympic long-distance runners
Paralympic marathon runners
20th-century Spanish people